Iowa Highway 3 (Iowa 3) is a state highway that runs from east to west across the state of Iowa. Iowa 3 begins at the South Dakota state line where it continues as South Dakota Highway 50 and ends at the Northwest Arterial at the Dubuque city limits. It is designated the American Veterans Memorial Highway for its entirety. It is located approximately halfway between Interstate 80 and Interstate 90.

Route description
All of Iowa 3 east of Le Mars has been listed on the National Highway System,  a network of roads important to the country's economy, defense, and mobility.

Iowa 3 begins at the Big Sioux River where it continues west into South Dakota as South Dakota Highway 50.  Shortly after entering Iowa, the highway intersects Iowa 12.  Iowa 3 traffic turns north onto Iowa 12 and the two highways travel together toward Akron.  There, the two highways split as Iowa 3 heads east toward Le Mars where it meets U.S. Highway 75 (US 75) and its business route.  The highway continues east toward Remsen and Marcus where it meets Iowa 140 and Iowa 143 in each respective town.  At Cherokee, the highway intersects US 59 and skirts the northeastern edge of town.  North of Aurelia, Iowa 3 meets Iowa 7.  Northeast of Truesdale, Iowa 3 intersects US 71.

Continuing east, Iowa 3 intersects Iowa 4 in Pocahontas.  Between Pocahontas and Gilmore City, Iowa 3 meets Iowa 15.  Iowa 3 intersects US 169 in Humboldt.  East of Humboldt, Iowa 3 is overlapped briefly by Iowa 17 near Goldfield.  Iowa 3 overlaps US 69 east of Clarion.  Between Latimer and Coulter, Iowa 3 meets I-35 at a diamond interchange.  East of that interchange in Hampton, Iowa 3 intersects US 65.  At Allison, Iowa 3 is briefly overlapped by Iowa 14.  Iowa 3 meets Iowa 188 south of Clarksville.

West of Waverly, Iowa 3 intersects US 218 / Iowa 27, the Avenue of the Saints highway, at an interchange.  Through Waverly, Iowa 3 is overlapped by US 218 Business before that route turns south to rejoin US 218.  Just north of Denver, Iowa 3 intersects US 63 at a diamond interchange.  At Oelwein, Iowa 3 overlaps Iowa 150 before continuing east towards Iowa 187.  From Strawberry Point to near Edgewood, Iowa 3 overlaps Iowa 13.  East of Edgewood, Iowa 3 enters the Driftless Area, where the terrain changes markedly from gently rolling farmland to steep bluffs; the intersection with Iowa 38 is located on the edge of the Driftless Area.  At Luxemburg, Iowa 3 meets US 52 and Iowa 136.  The next , from Luxemburg to Sageville, are particularly curvy because of the terrain.  At the city limits between Sageville and Dubuque, Iowa 3 ends at the Northwest Arterial, which carried Iowa 32 prior to 2020.

History

Original Iowa 3
Now known as Iowa Highway 2; that road was renumbered in 1939
Current Iowa 3 (as routed in 1920)
No. 12 – Westfield to Akron
No. 27 – Akron to Le Mars
No. 5 – Le Mars to near Aurelia
Gap between Aurelia and Pocahontas
No. 10 – Pocahontas to Strawberry Point
No. 13 – Strawberry Point to near Edgewood
Gap between Edgewood and Luxemburg
No. 20 – Luxemburg to Dubuque
Designated Iowa 3 on May 15, 1945
Extended to SD 50 in 1949
Overlapped by Iowa 5 until 1969
Rerouted through Dubuque due to reconstruction of US 61/US 151
Dubuque changes
SW Arterial constructed
US 52 rerouted
Iowa 3 ends at NW Arterial

This is the second state highway to be designated Iowa 3.  The first Iowa 3 existed from 1920 to 1941, and was an east–west route across the southern part of Iowa, beginning at Fort Madison and ending at the western border of Iowa near Nebraska City, Nebraska.  The current Iowa 3 route was designated in 1945.

Originally extending from Iowa 12 in Akron to Dubuque, Iowa 3 was co-signed with Iowa 5 from Akron to near Aurelia.  In 1949, Iowa 3 was extended along Iowa 12 from Akron to its current western end at the Big Sioux River.

Prior to the building of a four lane US 61 / US 151, the eastern end of Iowa 3 was at the intersection of Bluff Street and U.S. Route 20, Dodge Street.

Major intersections

References

External links

003
Transportation in Dubuque, Iowa
Transportation in Franklin County, Iowa